Okayama Electric Tramway Seikibashi Line is an Okayama Electric Tramway route that runs between Yanagawa Station (Okayama) and Seikibashi Station in Okayama, Okayama, Okayama Prefecture, Japan.

Outline 
This tram line is located in Okayama, and double-track which runs on many streets. The tram line can be split into Higashiyama Main Line and this tram line at Yanagawa Station (Okayama) and runs for the south district of Okayama City along the national highway Yanagawa Suji which is made of Okayama Prefectural Route 27,  Japan National Route 180 and Japan National Route 53 through Seikibashi Station.

Okayama Electric Tramway had a license that the line was extended to Hōsei District, but the license was abolished in 1960.

When this company constructed this tram line which runs on Yanagawa Suji, Okayama City suggested that using The Side Reservation Method サイドリザベーション方式 that the outbound line and the inbound line were installed on between each street and pedestrian road. This is the rare case as construction method in Japan. As the roads being reconstructed, this tram line was also reconstructed, simultaneously the platforms on all stations except Seikibashi Station were rebuilt as island type. In 2002, almost stations on the tram line was developed barrier-free excluding Seikibashi Station due to introduce Type 9200 MOMO. Seikibashi Station hadn't been upgraded to barrier-free. The station's platform has been moved to the place where is located under the bridge for pedestrians since 2007, and the station has been developed barrier-free.

Fares
A fare for riding on the entire line costs 140 yen (as of 2020). But, fare for riding on the tram line between Okayama Station and Yūbinkyoku Mae Station costs 100 yen, and the fare is at the same price as a lot of the competing buses which are operated from Okayama Station to Omotemachi Bus Center via Tenmanya Bus Terminal because Okayama tries to promote using public transportations.

History 
18 March 1928 - opened as Yanagawa Line between Yanagawa station and Daiunji-machi. 
1 September 1931 - Higashi-Tamachi Station opened, between Maroyamachi-Suji and Renshōji-mae.
6 July 1937 - Higashi-Tamachi Station renamed to Yūbinkyoku-mae Station.
23 June 1942 - Renshōji-mae renamed to Shiyakusho-mae Station (Okayama).
6 September 1946 - renamed from Yanagawa Line to Seikibashi Line, opening between Daiunji-machi and Seikibashi. Section between Shin-Saidaijimachisuji Station and Daiunji-machi Station discontinued.

Others 

References

External links 
  

Okayama
Tram transport in Japan
Transport in Okayama Prefecture